The Blackfalds Bulldogs is a  junior "A" ice hockey team that plays in the South Division of the Alberta Junior Hockey League (AJHL) based in Blackfalds, Alberta, Canada. The 2021–22 season is their inaugural season in Blackfalds. The team is owned by Doug Quinn and Jodie Quinn. The team plays at the Eagle Builders Centre in Blackfalds (Alberta), a large hockey arena that was completed in late 2021. In their first season, the Bulldogs qualified for the playoffs.

History 
After several seasons of struggling financially, the Calgary Mustangs of the AJHL commenced negotiations to relocate its franchise to Strathmore. After the relocation deal fell through, the team requested a leave of absence from the AJHL for the 2019–20 season. The AJHL approved the request in May 2019, allowing the Calgary Mustangs to explore either a more viable future in Calgary or a relocation. A few months later, the AJHL approved the purchase of the Mustangs by Doug Quinn, a businessman from Red Deer, and the relocation of the franchise to Blackfalds to begin to play in the 2021–22 season. The franchise announced its team name, the Blackfalds Bulldogs, in April 2020.

Team firsts
The new arena in Blackfalds (the Eagle Builders Centre) was not completed in time for the start of the 2021-22 season. Instead games in the exhibition season and the first part of the regular season were held in alternate locations around Alberta. These alternate Bulldogs’ home game locations included Bonnyville, Stettler, Lacombe, Penhold, and Red Deer. 

The very first regular-season game for the Bulldogs was a 17-0 blowout at the hands of the Brooks Bandits on Sep. 17, 2021, in Brooks, AB. The first game at home in the Eagle Builders Centre for the Bulldogs was on Oct. 19, 2021, in a 4-2 win over the Calgary Canucks. 

The first-ever AJHL goal scored by a member of the Blackfalds Bulldogs occurred in an exhibition game on Sep. 1, 2021, and was credited to Jayden Joly (2:08 of the 1st period, shorthanded, assisted by Ty McRuvie and Kai Matthew). The first regular-season goal scored for the Blackfalds Bulldogs was on Sep. 18, 2021, when Jayden Joly's shot found the back of the net (18:47 of the first period, powerplay goal, assists to Ethan Lund and Kyle Uganecz). The first home regular-season goal in the newly completed Eagle Builders Centre was on Nov 19, 2021, and was scored by Carter Yarish (shorthanded, assisted by Jace Benvie) at 5:56 of the first period. 

On Dec 31, 2021, the Bulldogs debuted their alternate 3rd, a tan-colored “B” with a spiked collar underneath, at a home game against the Brooks Bandits. It was again worn in a Jan 21, 2022, home game against the Olds Grizzlys. On Feb 18, 2022, the Bulldogs debuted their 'Pink Power' jerseys, a pink version of their alternate 3rd jersey, at a home game against the Bonnyville Pontiacs. It was again worn on Feb. 23, 2022 in a home game against the Camrose Kodiaks.

Season-by-season record
For previous teams' records, see Calgary Mustangs.

Legend: GP = Games played, W = Wins, L = Losses, T = Ties, OTL = Overtime losses, Pts = Points, GF = Goals for, GA = Goals against

Current roster 
Updated March 3, 2022 with further updates to come

Team  records

Team awards
Updating soon

Team captains

Coaches
Updated March 3, 2022

 Doug Quinn (Head Coach)
 Al Parada (Asst. Coach)
 Mike Moller (Asst. Coach)
 Pete Friestadt (Goalie Coach)
 Masi Marjamaki (Skills Coach)
 Mike Elchuk (Athletic Therapist and Equipment Manager)
 Brady Bakke (Assoc. Coach)
 Rob Hamill (Assoc. Coach)

Business operations
Updated March 3, 2022

 Mark Stiles (VP Business Operations)
 Michelle Brown (Community Relations)
 Braden Malsbury (Broadcaster)
 Katie Bradley (Game Day Supervisor)
 Josh Hall (Team Writer)
 David Leonard (Governor)

Hockey operations
Updated March 3, 2022

 Doug Quinn (Head Coach)
 Al Parada (Asst. Coach)
 Adam West (Asst. GM)
 Dr. Guy Tetrault (Academic Advisor)

Board of directors
Updated March 3, 2022

 Duston Moore (Executive Director)
 Gordon Mathers
 Kevin Walsh
 Myles Peake
 Vern Crone

Game day action photographers

See also 
 List of ice hockey teams in Alberta

References

External links 

Blackfalds
Alberta Junior Hockey League teams
Ice hockey teams in Alberta